This is a list of Tamil national-type primary schools (SJK(T)) in Kuala Lumpur, Malaysia. As of June 2022, there are 15 Tamil primary schools with a total of 3,561 students.

List of Tamil national-type primary schools in Kuala Lumpur

See also 

 Tamil primary schools in Malaysia
 Lists of Tamil national-type primary schools in Malaysia

References

Schools in Kuala Lumpur
Kuala Lumpur
Kuala lumpur